The 1963 National Invitation Tournament was the 1963 edition of the annual NCAA college basketball competition.

Selected teams
Below is a list of the 12 teams selected for the tournament.

 Canisius
 DePaul
 Fordham
 La Salle
 Marquette
 Memphis
 Miami (FL)
 Providence
 Saint Louis
 St. Francis (NY)
 Villanova
 Wichita State

Bracket
Below is the tournament bracket.

See also
 1963 NCAA University Division basketball tournament
 1963 NCAA College Division basketball tournament
 1963 NAIA Division I men's basketball tournament

References

National Invitation
National Invitation Tournament
1960s in Manhattan
Basketball in New York City
College sports in New York City
Madison Square Garden
National Invitation Tournament
National Invitation Tournament
Sports competitions in New York City
Sports in Manhattan